Live in Seattle 2002 is a live album by Eric Burdon and his current band called "The New Animals". While Burdon had no new studio album released, he performed hits from the sixties. On "Spill the Wine" they were joined by Lee Oskar on harmonica.

Track list

 "I'm Crying" (3:37)
 "It's my Life" (3:41)
 "When I Was Young" (4:15)
 "We Gotta Get out of This Place" (12:05)
 "Don't Let Me Be Misunderstood" (5:56)
 "Spill the Wine" (8:54)
 "Hey Gyp" (9:36)
 "Boom Boom" (6:36)
 "Sky Pilot"  (8:48)
 "The House of the Rising Sun" (6:41)
 "You Got Me Floating" (2:53)

References

Eric Burdon albums
2002 live albums